Dinesh Bhramar is a Hindi and Bhojpuri poet from Bihar, India. He has been credited to introduce the Ghazal and Ruba'i in Bhojpuri literature.

Early life and education 
Bhramar was born in 1939 in British India at Bagaha, a small township in undivided Champaran, Bihar. His father Pt. Gunjeshwari Pathak was a Sanskrit scholar and patron of classical arts. Bhramar graduated in Hindi literature from Patna University in 1961.

Career 
Bhramar taught Hindi Literature at M.J.K College, Bettiah as a lecturer (1961-1962) and later at Tata Workers College, Jamshedpur as a reader (1962-1966).

In various Kavi sammelan, he has shared the stage with several eminent Hindi poets such as Ramdhari Singh Dinkar, Ajneya, Gopal Singh Nepali, Janki Ballabh Shastri, Nida Fazli, Bashir Badr and others. His poetical works were commended by Harivansh Rai Bachchan and Nazir Banarsi. Some of his Hindi poetic works have been selected for 'Navgeet Saptdasak' edited by Rajendra Prasad Singh and 'Dharati Se Judkar', edited by Satyanarayan. He is not very fond of publishing books, the only exception being ‘Geet Mere Swara Tumhare’   published in 1961.

Besides the poetry works, Bhramar has been associated with various literary movements and organized several series of Kavi sammelan and Mushaira and other literary and cultural events for several decades in and around Champaran district.

Awards and recognition 

He has been awarded the Gopal Singh Nepali Samman (2011), Bazme Adab (1999), Lok Shikar Samman (1998), Champaran Ratna (1993), and Sahitya Saurabh Samman (1972).

Books

References

External links
Some of the Hindi Gazals of Dinesh Bhramar on Aaj Tak/India Today website
Dinesh Bhramar's Bhojpuri Gazals on KavitaKosh
Geet Mere Swara Tumhare: A collection of Hindi poems (Navgeet) published in 1961
Jagarn ke geet Lohu ke chhand: Book published in 1962
Author Rameshchandra Jha on Dinesh Bhramar, in his book on literary history of Champaran, Bihar
Memoir of an ISKON sanyasin who visits Dinesh Bhramar in 2013 

Hindi-language poets
Living people
1939 births
People from Bihar